Sydaphera is a genus of sea snails, marine gastropod mollusks in the family Cancellariidae, the nutmeg snails.

Species
Species within the genus Sydaphera include:

 Sydaphera anxifer (Iredale, 1925)
 Sydaphera australis (G.B. Sowerby I, 1832)
 Sydaphera christiana Verhecken, 2008
 Sydaphera delicosa Laseron, 1955
 Sydaphera fulva (Lee & Lan, 2002)
 Sydaphera granosa (G.B. Sowerby I, 1832b)
 Sydaphera lactea (Deshayes, 1830) :
 Sydaphera obnixa (Iredale, 1936)
 Sydaphera panamuna (Garrard, 1975) :
 Sydaphera spengleriana (Deshayes, 1830)
 Sydaphera tasmanica (Tenison-Woods, 1876)
Synonyms
 Sydaphera gigantea (Lee & Lan, 2002): synonym of Merica (Sydaphera) gigantea (Y.-C. Lee & T. C. Lan, 2002) represented as Merica gigantea (Y.-C. Lee & T. C. Lan, 2002)
 Sydaphera purpuriformis (Kiener, 1841): synonym of Merica purpuriformis (Kiener, 1841)
 Sydaphera undulata (G.B. Sowerby II, 1849): accepted as Merica (Sydaphera) undulata (G. B. Sowerby II, 1849) represented as Merica undulata (G. B. Sowerby II, 1849)

References

 Hemmen, J. (2007). Recent Cancellariidae. Annotated and illustrated catalogue of Recent Cancellariidae. Privately published, Wiesbaden. 428 pp

External links
 Iredale, T. (1929). Strange molluscs in Sydney Harbour. Australian Zoologist. 5(4): 337-352

Cancellariidae